Perk Summit is a mountain peak, 1,750 m, that is the highest elevation on the ridge between Mount McLennan and Mount Keohane, in Asgard Range, Victoria Land. Named by Advisory Committee on Antarctic Names (US-ACAN) (1997) after Henry Perk, Chief Pilot, Kenn Borek Air, Ltd., Calgary, Canada, who has flown Twin Otter aircraft in the McMurdo Sound region and in many remote parts of the continent in direct support of the U.S. Antarctic Program from 1989.

Mountains of the Asgard Range
McMurdo Dry Valleys